David Thomas Roberts (born January 16, 1955) is an American composer and musician, known primarily as a modern ragtime composer.  Roberts is also a painter in a primitivist style.

Born in Moss Point, Mississippi, United States, his first recording, "Music For a Pretty Baby", appeared in 1978. Pieces such as "The Early Life of Larry Hoffer", "Roberto Clemente", "Pinelands Memoir", "Through the Bottomlands", and the suite, "New Orleans Streets" have caused Roberts to be considered one of the leading contemporary ragtime-based composers. The New Orleans historian Al Rose called him "the most important composer of this half of the century in America."

Roberts coined the term "Terra Verde" (meaning "green earth") as a label for compositions which can not be considered as conventional ragtime, mostly by contemporary ragtime writers such as himself, Frank French, Scott Kirby, Hal Isbitz and others.

Roberts also works as a writer and visual artist. His mixed-media art appears in the magazine of visionary art, Raw Vision, and his poetry has been anthologized in Another South, a collection of experimental writing published in 2003 by the University of Alabama Press.

Selected discography

From Discovery (2005) 
(All original compositions, except where noted.)
 Discovery (2004)
 Charbonneau (2000) (Kirby)
 Mariana's Waltz (2003)
 Ice Floes in Eden (1986) (Budd)
 Memories of a Missouri Confederate (1989)
 Fantasy in D (2000–01)
 Chorale-Prelude (1989)
 Chorale No. 2 (1990)
 Frederic and the Coast (1979)
 Cynthia (2003–04)
 Babe of the Mountains (1997–98)
 Nancy's Library (2004–05)

From American Landscapes (1998) 
(All original compositions, except the track "Dixon.")
 Pinelands Memoir (1978)
 The Girl Who Moved Away (1981–82)
 Back to Marion County (1981)
 Through the Bottomlands (1980)
 Muscatine (1979)
 Kreole (1978)
 Dixon (1983)
 The Girl On the Other Side (1979)
 Franklin Avenue (1981–85)
 Fontainebleau Drive (1981–85)
 Napoleon Avenue (1981–85)
 Madison Heights Girl (1979)
 Anna (1978)
 Roberto Clemente (1979)
 For Kansas City (1980)

From Early Tangoes to New Ragtime (1994) 
(Mostly compositions by others. Roberts' compositions include For Molly Kaufman, Memories of a Missouri Confederate, and The Queen of North Missouri.)
 Odeon
 Matuto
 Rapid Transit
 Bee Hive Rag
 The Naked Dance
 For Molly Kaufmann
 The Show-me Rag
 The Nonpareil
 Mississippi River Boulevard
 Show Fly
 Memories of a Missouri Confederate
 Belle of Louisville
 Morelia
 Esta' Chumbado
 Escovado
 The Big Man
 Mississippi Soul
 The Queen of North Missouri
 Ravenna

From Scott Joplin the Complete Piano Music, Vol. 1 
(All compositions by Scott Joplin.)
 Original Rags
 Leola
 Pleasant Moments
 Peacherine Rag
 Sunflower Slow Drag
 Maple Leaf Rag
 Weeping Willow
 Bink's Waltz
 Elite Syncopations
 The Favorite
 Swipesy
 Antoinette
 The Nonpareil
 Gladiolus Rag
 The Easy Winners

From 15 Ragtime Compositions 
(All original compositions by Roberts.)
 Waterloo Girls
 Camille
 Kreole
 Frederic and the Coast
 Madison Heights Girl
 Poplarville
 Through the Bottomlands
 Pinelands Memoir
 For Kansas City
 The Girl Who Moved Away
 Mississippi Brown Eyes
 The Early Life of Larry Hoffer
 The South Mississippi Glide
 Roberto Clemente
 Maria Antonieta Pons

From New Orleans Streets 
(All original compositions by Roberts.)
 Introduction
 Decatur Street
 Burgundy Street
 Franklin Avenue
 Jackson Avenue
 Waltz
 Napoleon Avenue
 Magazine Street
 Toulouse Street
 Annunciation Street
 Broad Avenue
 Interlude
 Fontainbleau Drive
 Revenge
 Farewell

From New Orleans Ragtime Piano 
(Roberts plays compositions by others.)
 Pretty Baby
 Kansas City Stomps
 Mamanita
 Fat Frances
 Honky Tonk Music
 Stratford Hunch
 The Pearls
 Tom Cat Blues
 Mr. Jelly Lord
 New Orleans Joys
 The Naked Dance
 Sponge

From Folk Ragtime: 1899-1914 
(Roberts plays compositions by others.)
 Blue Blazes
 Tennessee Tantalizer (a Southern Tickler)
 A Tennessee Jubilee
 Tickled to Death
 Poison Rag
 Scizzor Bill
 The Dockstader Rag
 Camp Meeting Melodies
 Blind Boone's Southern Rag Medley No.2 (strains From Flat Branch)
 Felix Rag (a Phenomenal Double Ragtime Two Step)
 The Pirate Rag
 Medic Rag
 Just Ask Me
 Why We Smile
 Cotton Bolls
 Possum and 'Taters (A Ragtime Feast)
 The Black Cat Rag
 X.L. Rag
 A Barn Dance Shuffle
 Whittling Remus
 Lover's Lane Glide

Other David Thomas Roberts compositions / recordings 
 To Nita and Raul Casso in Laredo appear on the CD Terra Verde.
 For Robin Holtz Williams appears on the album Frontiers.

See also
 List of ragtime composers

References

External links
Roberts' website
The Terra Verde Corner
Roberts' article on Terra Verde Music
Interview with Roberts
Interview on NPR
Artwork by Roberts

1955 births
20th-century American composers
20th-century classical composers
21st-century American composers
21st-century classical composers
American classical composers
American classical musicians
American male classical composers
Living people
Ragtime composers
20th-century American male musicians
21st-century American male musicians